Jaroslav Penc (born 27 May 1948) is a Czech volleyball player. He competed at the 1972 Summer Olympics and the 1976 Summer Olympics.

References

1948 births
Living people
Czech men's volleyball players
Olympic volleyball players of Czechoslovakia
Volleyball players at the 1972 Summer Olympics
Volleyball players at the 1976 Summer Olympics
Sportspeople from Prague